Task Force 1-41 Infantry was a U.S. Army heavy battalion task force which took part in the Gulf War of January – March 1991. It was also known as Task Force Iron. Task Force 1-41 Infantry was the first coalition force to breach the Saudi Arabian border on 15 February 1991 and conduct ground combat operations in Iraq engaging in direct and indirect fire fights with the enemy on 17 February 1991. It was the spearhead of VII Corps. The Task Force served at the Battle of 73 Easting and the Battle of Norfolk where it was assigned to the U.S. 1st Infantry Division. It engaged and destroyed elements of 11 Iraqi divisions by the end of combat operations. This includes a significant role in the destruction of 4 Iraqi armored brigades at the Battle of Norfolk. Task Force 1-41 Infantry was awarded a Valorous Unit Award for its accomplishments during combat operations. Task Force 1-41 was commanded by Lieutenant Colonel James L. Hillman.

Organization
Task Force 1-41 Infantry comprised the following units:
Headquarters and Headquarters Company (HHC), 1st Battalion, 41st Infantry
Company B, 1st Battalion, 41st Infantry
Company C, 1st Battalion, 41st Infantry
Company A, 3rd Battalion, 66th Armor

Company B, 3rd Battalion, 66th Armor
Company D, 317th Engineer Battalion
Company D, 9th Engineer Battalion
3rd Platoon, Battery C, 2nd Battalion, 3rd Air Defense Artillery
Two Ground Support Radar sections
Fire Support Element, 4th Battalion, 3rd Field Artillery
System Support Team, 498th Support Battalion

History

Formation
The 2nd Armored Division (Forward) arrived in Saudi Arabia in early January 1991, with 1-41 Infantry arriving on 8 January.
After arrival in Saudi Arabia, 1st Battalion, 41st Infantry, was task organized (effectively merged in parts) with 3rd Battalion, 66th Armor Regiment. This 'task organization', routine before combat, was designed to ensure that infantry and armour were present in balanced organizations so that they could provide mutual support. The task force's higher headquarters, 3rd Brigade, 2nd Armored Division, was itself attached to the 1st Infantry Division (Mechanized) to make up for a missing brigade of that division. The brigade became also known as Task Force Iron. It would become the spearhead of VII Corps. The U.S.VII Corps was a formidable fighting force. In its inventory were 1,487 tanks, 1,384 infantry fighting vehicles, 568 artillery pieces, 132 MLRS, 8 missile launchers, and 242 attack helicopters.  It had a total troop strength of 146,321 troops.

The 1st Battalion, 41st Infantry Regiment was equipped with M2 Bradley infantry fighting vehicles and formed part of the 2nd Armored Division (Forward). The other combat battalions of the brigade were the 2nd and 3rd Battalions of the 66th Armor Regiment (equipped with M1A1 Abrams tanks) and the 4th Battalion of the 3rd Field Artillery Regiment (equipped with M109 howitzers). During exercises the battalion regularly exchanged combat elements with the other combat units in the division, with B company of 3-66 Armor being frequently attached to 1-41 Infantry.

After receiving their equipment and moving to a forward area near the border with Iraq, 1-41 Infantry and 3-66 Armor exchanged companies on 31 January to task organize for combat; A and D companies of 1-41 Infantry were attached to 3-66 Armor, and the infantry battalion received A and B companies of 3-66 Armor. Task Force 1-41 also comprised two companies of engineers, a platoon from the 2nd Battalion, 3rd Air Defense Artillery Regiment and a fire support element from the 4-3 FA. While technically not part of the Task Force, ten U.S. Army Special Forces ODAs performed reconnaissance operations for the Task Force and other elements of VII Corps. 4-3 FA relied on its Field Artillery Advance Party Teams to perform its reconnaissance operations.

Counter reconnaissance operations
Shortly after arrival in theatre Task Force 1-41 Infantry received a counter reconnaissance mission. This generally includes destroying or repelling the Iraqi's reconnaissance elements and denying their commander any observation of friendly forces. 1-41 Infantry was assisted by the 1st Squadron, 4th Cavalry Regiment. This joint effort would become known as Task Force Iron. On 15 February 1991 4th Battalion of the 3rd Field Artillery Regiment, fired on a trailer and a few trucks in the Iraqi sector that was observing American forces. On 16 February 1991 several groups of Iraqi vehicles appeared to be performing reconnaissance on the Task Force and were driven away by fire from 4-3 FA.

That same evening an Iraqi platoon, including six vehicles, was reported as being to the northeast of the Task Force. They belonged to the Iraqi 25th Infantry Division. They were engaged with artillery fire from 4-3 FA. Later that evening another group of Iraqi vehicles was spotted moving towards the center of the Task Force. The vehicles appeared to be Iraqi Soviet made BTR-60s and tanks. Task Force 1-41 Infantry fired TOW missiles at the Iraqi formation destroying one tank. The rest of the formation was destroyed or driven away by artillery fire from 4-3 FA.   For the next hour the Task Force would fight several small battles with Iraqi reconnaissance units. On 17 February 1991 the Task Force took enemy mortar fire, and the Iraqi forces managed to escape. Later that evening the Task Force received enemy artillery fire but suffered no casualties. That same evening the Task Force identified an Iraqi mortar position and engaged it with both direct and indirect fires. The Iraqis continued probing operations against the Task Force for approximately two hours. For the next two days the Task Force observed Iraqi wheeled vehicles and small units move in front of them. Several times Iraqi mortars fired on Task Force 1-41 Infantry positions. On 18 February Iraqi mortar positions continued to conduct fire missions against the Task Force. The Task Force returned fire on the Iraqi positions with artillery fire from 4-3 FA and 1st Infantry Division Artillery. During the Iraqi mortar attacks two American soldiers were wounded. Iraqi reconnaissance elements continued to patrol the area between the Task Force and the 1st Cavalry Division.  VII Corps air units and artillery conducted combat operations against Iraqi defensive positions.

Breaching operations

Task Force 1-41 Infantry was the first coalition force to breach the Saudi Arabian border on 15 February 1991 and conduct ground combat operations in Iraq engaging in direct and indirect fire fights with the enemy on 17 February 1991. On 17 February 1991 Task Force 1-41 Infantry engaged an Iraqi mortar position with direct and indirect fires. Prior to this action the Task Force's primary fire support battalion 4th Battalion of the 3rd Field Artillery Regiment participated in a massive artillery preparation against Iraq's VII Corps . Around 300 guns from multiple nations participated in the artillery barrage. Over 14,000 rounds would be fired during these missions against the Iraqi VII Corps. M270 Multiple Launch Rocket Systems contributed an additional 4,900 rockets fired at Iraqi targets. Iraq lost close to 22 artillery battalions during the initial stages of this barrage. This would include the destruction of approximately 396 Iraqi artillery pieces. By the end of these raids Iraqi artillery assets had all but ceased to exist. One Iraqi unit that was totally destroyed during the preparation was the Iraqi 48th Infantry Division Artillery Group. The group's commander stated his unit lost 83 of its 100 guns to the artillery preparation. This artillery prep was supplemented by air attacks by B-52 bombers and Lockheed AC-130 fixed wing gunships.  On 20 February 1991 4-3 FA participated in a artillery raid against multiple Iraqi targets. This raid led to the destructions of multiple Iraqi artillery and armor units along with multiple command posts. On 22 February and 23 February 1st Infantry Division artillery and 4-3 FA conducted artillery raids against Iraqi targets. On 23 February 1991 4-3 FA participated in another successful artillery raid. This raid led to the destruction of additional Iraqi artillery assets, maneuver, command, and logistics targets. 1st Infantry Division Artillery and AH-64 Apache attack helicopters conducted operations against the Iraqi 26th Infantry Division. B-52 bombers conducted missions against the Iraqi 48th Infantry Division. On 24 February 1991 1st Cavalry Division conducted artillery and aviation missions against a series of Iraqi bunkers which were supported by Iraqi 25th Division's T-55 tank units.

Once into Iraqi territory Task Force 1-41 Infantry encountered multiple Iraqi defensive positions and bunkers. These defensive positions were occupied by a brigade-sized element. Task Force 1-41 Infantry elements dismounted and prepared to engage the enemy soldiers which occupied these well-prepared and heavily fortified bunkers. The Task Force found itself engaged in six hours of combat in order to clear the extensive bunker complex. The Iraqis engaged the Task Force with small arms fire, RPGs, mortar fire, and what was left of Iraqi artillery assets. A series of battles unfolded which resulted in heavy Iraqi casualties and the Iraqis being removed from their defensive positions with many becoming prisoners of war. Some escaped to be killed or captured by other coalition forces.

In the process of clearing the bunkers Task Force 1-41 captured two brigade command posts and the command post of the Iraqi 26th Infantry Division. The Task Force also captured a brigade commander, several battalion commanders, company commanders, and staff officers. As combat operations progressed Task Force 1-41 Infantry engaged at short range multiple dug in enemy tanks in ambush positions. For a few hours, bypassed Iraqi RPG equipped anti-tank teams, T-55 tanks, and dismounted Iraqi infantry fired at passing American vehicles, only to be destroyed by other US tanks and fighting vehicles following the initial forces.

Combat
A two and one half hour 90,000 round artillery preparation fire, on Iraqi defensive positions, preceded the major ground assault.

On 24 February 1991 the Task Force was engaged by Iraqi infantry units armed with RPGs. The Iraqi soldiers were either killed or captured. Later that same day 4-3 FA conducted artillery strikes to the north of its position against Iraqi targets. The Iraqis would engage Task Force 1–41 with artillery and mortar fire with little success. That same day the Task Force, along with other American units, continued clearing Phase Line New Jersey. Later on 24 February 1991 Task Force 1-41 would have a hand in the destruction of the Iraqi 110th and 434th Infantry Brigades of the Iraqi 26th Infantry Division.

On 25 February 1991 the Task Force would engage and destroy the Iraqi Jihad Corps, which consisted of the 10th and 12th Armored Divisions, in direct combat. The Iraqi 10th Armored Division was considered the best regular division in the Iraqi Army. It had more modern equipment than the other regular Iraqi units. It was equipped with T-72 and T-62 tanks. The T-62 tank being its primary system. On 26 February 1991 the Task Force, led by 3-66 Armor Battalion, would engage and destroy an Iraqi T-55 tank battalion.

On the eve of 26–27 February 1991 the Task Force destroyed elements of the Iraqi 12th Armored Division. This was a slow moving division that lacked the capability for modern day armored warfare. Some 40 Iraqi tanks were destroyed and a similar number of other combat vehicles.

The Task Force served at the Battle of 73 Easting with the 1st Infantry Division (Mechanized)  along with the  2nd Armored Cavalry Regiment. They were responsible for destroying the Iraqi 18th Mechanized and 9th Armored Brigades of the Republican Guard Tawakalna Mechanized Infantry Division and the Iraqi 26th Infantry Division. The Tawakalna Republican Guard Division was Iraq's most powerful division which included approximately 14,000 soldiers, 220 T-72 tanks, 284 infantry fighting vehicles, 126 artillery pieces, and 18 MLRS. In moving to and through the Battle of 73 Easting, 2nd ACR and the 1st Infantry division's lead brigades, which included Task Force 1-41, destroyed 160 tanks, 180 personnel carriers, 12 artillery pieces and more than 80 wheeled vehicles, along with several anti-aircraft artillery systems during the battle.

A reconnaissance party from Battery C, 4-3 FA mistakenly moved well forward of the other Task Force 1-41 Infantry units. Task Force 3-66 Armor was given the assignment of looking for the lost reconnaissance party. As Task Force 3-66 Armor approached the reconnaissance party, enemy infantry foolishly took it under fire from fighting positions near the disoriented recon party. TF 3-66 M1A1 Abrams tanks and Bradley infantry fighting vehicles fought back with only machine guns rather than cannons to reduce the danger of hitting TF 1-41 IN, which stood just beyond the enemy. TF 3-66 AR machine gun fire drove the enemy right into TF 1-41 IN with Hillman's troops capturing all of the enemy soldiers. TF 3-66 AR recovered the members of the lost reconnaissance party unharmed.

During the early stages of the Battle of Norfolk American artillery and MLRS units conducted fire missions against Iraqi targets a dozen miles to the east. 1st Infantry Division Artillery, including 4-3 FA battalion, was decisive during combat operations performing multiple raids and fire missions. These combat operations resulted in the destruction of 50 enemy tanks, 139 APCs, 30 air defense systems, 152 artillery pieces, 27 missile launchers, 108 mortars, and 548 wheeled vehicles, 61 trench lines and bunker positions, 92 dug in and open infantry targets, and 34 logistical sites. The 4-3 FA battalion would fire a total of 2,339 rounds during all field artillery combat operations. 
Also, during the early stages of the battle two American Bradley Infantry Fighting Vehicles were destroyed by the Iraqi Republican Guard 18th Mechanized Brigade while conducting forward reconnaissance. 

On 27 February 1991 Task Force 1-41 Infantry destroyed an Iraqi T-55 tank battalion that ambushed Battery C, 4-3 FA. The Iraqi tank unit was destroyed by a Task Force 1-41 tank platoon that was assigned to protect Battery C, 4-3 FA. The Iraqi tank unit managed to destroy a Bradley Fighting Vehicle and killed three soldiers belonging to the task force. On 27 February Task Force 1-41 Infantry also destroyed an Iraqi RPG team, machine gun nest, and a bunker.  On 27 February 1991 Task Force 1-41 destroyed another Iraqi tank unit at great range at Objective Denver. The 2nd Armored Division(Fwd) continued to fight a series of short, sharp battles with Iraqi tank platoons as it moved across the Wadi al-Batin into Kuwait. On 27 February 1991, the 2nd Armored Division (Forward) destroyed 60 Iraqi tanks and 35 infantry vehicles along the Iraq Pipeline to Saudi Arabia (IPSA). Task Force 1-41 Infantry would spend several hours engaging additional Iraqi infantry and armor units in a confusing melee that led to friendly fire incidents. Task Force 1-41 would suffer the loss of five Abrams tanks and two Bradley Fighting Vehicles during these particular engagements. Almost two dozen American soldiers would be wounded. The Task Force pulled back and 4-3 FA would successfully engage the remaining Iraqi Infantry units. Task Force 1-41 and other 2nd Armored Division(Fwd) units would successfully secure the Iraq Pipeline to Saudi Arabia and capture a massive Iraqi logisitics installation in the process. The Task Force and the 1st Infantry Division  also cleared an extensive bunker complex which housed RPG equipped Iraqi infantry.

In the thick of the fog of war, U.S. units became mixed with Iraqi units dispersed throughout the desert. This confusion led to some friendly fire incidents. Task Force 1-41 Infantry was involved in the worst US "friendly fire" incident of the Gulf War on 27 February 1991. Task Force 1-41 inflicted heavy losses on Iraqi forces and also captured hundreds of Iraqi soldiers including almost an entire Iraqi tank battalion on 27 February 1991.

Before the end of combat operations the Task Force would engage a total of 11 Iraqi divisions. This included a significant role in the destruction of four Iraqi armored or mechanized brigades at the Battle of Norfolk. Task Force 1-41 Infantry would capture over 300 enemy prisoners. The Task Force suffered 32 casualties and around a dozen combat vehicles were destroyed, including five M1A1 Abrams tanks, during combat operations. Task Force 1-41 Infantry earned a Valorous Unit Award for its efforts. The Valorous Unit Award is the second highest unit combat decoration which may be bestowed upon a U.S. Army unit.

By the end of combat operations on 28 February 1991, U.S. VII Corps had driven 260 kilometers, captured 22,000 Iraqi soldiers, and destroyed 1,350 Iraqi tanks, 1,224 armored personnel carriers, 285 artillery pieces, 105 air defense systems, and 1,229 trucks.

Valorous Unit Award citation

See also
 History of the M1 Abrams
 Republican Guard (Iraq)
 Battle of Medina Ridge
 2nd Armored Division (United States)
 Bradley Fighting Vehicle
 M109 howitzer
 BMP development

References

Bibliography

 

The First Infantry Division and the U.S. Army Transformed: Road to Victory in Desert Storm, 1970-1991 by Gregory Fontenot
Desert Redleg: Artillery Warfare in the First Gulf War by Col. L. Scott Lingamfelter

Ad hoc units and formations of the United States Army
Military units and formations of the United States in the Gulf War
Military units and formations established in 1991
1991 establishments in the United States